Armin Krings (born 22 November 1962) is a retired Luxembourgian football striker. He became Luxembourg National Division top goalscorer in 1988–89 and 1992–93.

References

1962 births
Living people
Luxembourgian footballers
Luxembourgian people of German descent
FC Avenir Beggen players
FC Mondercange players
Association football forwards
Luxembourg international footballers